This is a list of years in Bangladesh. See also the timeline of Bangladeshi history.

Bangladesh

Pakistan (1947–1970)

British India (1900–1946)

See also 
 Timeline of Bangladeshi history
 Timeline of Dhaka

 
Bangladesh history-related lists
Bangladesh